"If I Had a Hammer (The Hammer Song)" is a protest song written by Pete Seeger and Lee Hays.  It was written in 1949 in support of the Progressive movement, and was first recorded by the Weavers, a folk music quartet composed of Seeger, Hays, Ronnie Gilbert, and Fred Hellerman. It was a #10 hit for Peter, Paul and Mary in 1962 and then went to #3 a year later when recorded by Trini Lopez in 1963.

The Weavers released the song under the title "The Hammer Song" as a 78 rpm single in March 1950 on Hootenanny Records, 101-A, backed with "Banks of Marble".

Early versions
The song was first performed publicly by Pete Seeger and Lee Hays on June 3, 1949, at St. Nicholas Arena in New York City at a testimonial dinner for the leaders of the Communist Party of the United States, who were then on trial in federal court, charged with violating the Smith Act by advocating the overthrow of the U.S. government. It was not particularly successful in commercial terms when it was first released. It was part of the three songs Seeger played as the warm-up act for Paul Robeson's September 4 concert near Peekskill, New York, which subsequently erupted into a notorious riot.

Hit versions
It fared notably better commercially when it was recorded by Peter, Paul and Mary 12 years later. Their version of the song, released in July 1962 from the group's debut album became a top 10 hit, and won the Grammy Awards for Best Folk Recording and Best Performance by a Vocal Group. Trini Lopez's 1963 single went to number three on the same Billboard chart. It was included on his album Trini Lopez at PJ's (Reprise R/RS 6093).

Other versions
 Martha and the Vandellas performed it on their 1963 album Heat Wave.
 Ross MacManus, father of Elvis Costello, sang the song with the Joe Loss Orchestra on the BBC's Royal Variety Show in 1963.
 The Sam Cooke album Sam Cooke at the Copa (1964) contains a live version of the song.
 Leonard Nimoy covered the song in 1968. It was republished in 1993 as part of the Highly Illogical compilation, and in 1997 as part of the Spaced Out compilation. Critics derided Nimoy's version, calling it "a real lowlight." Sado-masochistic performance artist Bob Flanagan pounded nails into his scrotum while playing Nimoy's version.
 Chilean singer Victor Jara included a Spanish-language version of the song titled "El martillo" on his 1969 album Pongo en tus manos abiertas. Promoting left-wing political ideas, Jara was making a connection between U.S. civil rights concerns and the same in Chile. Later, in 1971, he covered another U.S. song: the political satire of "Little Boxes".
 Johnny Cash released the song in 1972 with his wife June Carter Cash singing harmony. The song hit number 29 on the US country chart in August 1972, and it was included on his album  Any Old Wind That Blows (1973). Cash's version was more in the rock music vein, powered by two electric guitarists: Carl Perkins on lead and solo, and Bob Wootton handling rhythm.
 Wanda Jackson released the song as a single in 1969. It was included on her album The Many Moods of Wanda Jackson.  It reached number 41 on the US country chart in April 1969.
Bruce Springsteen recorded an unrehearsed version of the song with a star-studded group in 2004, but the track was left out of the resulting album We Shall Overcome: The Seeger Sessions (2006) because Springsteen was concerned that the song's fame would upstage the lesser-known songs on the album. The album was successful, attracting more fans to Seeger's music. In 2018, Springsteen's Seeger Sessions version of "Hammer" was released in a compilation album titled Appleseed's 21st Anniversary – Roots And Branches.

Legacy
The song "If I Had a Hammer" was a freedom song of the civil rights movement. It had a tremendous impact on the American youth in the 1960s who protested against the American culture. It helped to spark the hippie movement.

Charts

References

External links
Lyrics on Arlo Guthrie website
Lyrics and a collection of quotes about "If I Had A Hammer"
Ross MacManus performing the song

1949 songs
1962 singles
1963 singles
Songs written by Pete Seeger
The Weavers songs
Peter, Paul and Mary songs
Pete Seeger songs
Trini Lopez songs
Sam Cooke songs
The Coasters songs
Johnny Cash songs
Grammy Award for Best Ethnic or Traditional Folk Recording
Warner Records singles
Columbia Records singles
Song recordings produced by Albert Grossman
Song recordings produced by Milt Okun
Reprise Records singles
Protest songs
Number-one singles in Mexico
Communist songs